

The Levasseur PL.6 C.2, also known as Levasseur VI C.2, was a two-seat fighter aircraft built in France in 1926 in order to meet a 1925 C.2 Service Technique de l'Aéronautique (STAé) specification, (C.2 - Chasseur 2 seat). Constructed along the same lines as Levasseur's naval aircraft of the same era, it was a conventional, single-bay biplane with seating for the pilot and tail gunner in separate, open cockpits. Flight testing of the prototype commenced in 1926, and it was exhibited at the Salon de l'Aéronautique at the end of the year.

The PL.6 was evaluated against the Aviméta 88, Les Mureaux 3, Les Mureaux 4, Blériot-SPAD S.60, Villiers XXIV and Wibault 12 Sirocco. However, before any one of these was selected for production, the requirement was cancelled. No further PL.6s were built.

Specifications

References

1920s French fighter aircraft
Levasseur aircraft
Biplanes
Single-engined tractor aircraft
Aircraft first flown in 1924